The Ariana Brewery is a defunct company, founded in 1884 in Sofia, Bulgaria under the name Sofia Brewery, changing to Ariana in 1996.

The brewery was bought by Heineken International in 1997, and closed down in 2004, with production of its main brands, Ariana and Stolichno, transferred to the Zagorka Brewery.

History 
Founded by the Czech Proshek brothers in 1884, the Sofia brewery began producing Proshekovo Pivo using Czech brewing practices, leading the beer to be awarded a gold medal at Antwerp in 1891.

In 1947, the brewery was nationalized by the communist regime and renamed Vitosha, and the beer was eventually renamed Sofiisko Pivo. A second factory was built in the nearby village of Gorublyane, and in 1978 the brewery in central Sofia was closed. The company changed its name to Ariana brewery in 1996.

In 1997, Ariana was bought out by Heineken, and in 2004 production was moved to the Zagorka brewery. Ariana accounts for 50% of total sales of Zagorka AD. 

The brewery shares its name with the nearby Lake Ariana.

References

External links 
 Ariana Brewery History – Zagorka.bg

Food and drink companies established in 1884
Food and drink companies disestablished in 2004
1880s establishments in Bulgaria
2000s disestablishments in Bulgaria
Defunct manufacturing companies of Bulgaria
Manufacturing companies based in Sofia
Breweries in Bulgaria
Defunct breweries